Harry E. Speelman (October 4, 1916 – April 1, 1983) was an American football player. He played college football for Michigan State University and professional football for the Detroit Lions.

Early years
Speelman was born in Detroit in 1916. He attended Central High School in Lansing, Michigan.

Michigan State
He played college football for Michigan State College (later known as Michigan State University) from 1935 to 1937. He was captain of the 1937 Michigan State Spartans football team that lost to Auburn in the 1938 Orange Bowl.

Professional football
After graduating from Michigan State, Speelman was a coach at Redford Union High School. In August 1940, he signed with the Detroit Lions of National Football League. He appeared in three games as a guard for the Lions in 1940. He also played as a guard and tackle for the Jersey City Giants in 1951. He appeared in 10 games, seven as a starter, for the Giants.

Later years
In 1943, he was hired as the football coach at St. Gregory High School in Detroit. He later worked as the director off attendance for the Detroit public school. He moved to Pigeon, Michigan, in 1977 and died there in 1983.

References

1916 births
1983 deaths
American football guards
Michigan State Spartans football players
Detroit Lions players
Players of American football from Detroit